The fawn-colored mouse (Mus cervicolor) is a species of rodent in the family Muridae.
It is found in Cambodia, India, and possibly Indonesia, Laos, Myanmar, Nepal, Thailand, and Vietnam.

References

Mus (rodent)
Rodents of India
Mammals of Nepal
Mammals described in 1845
Taxonomy articles created by Polbot